I Lost My Body is a 2019 French adult animated fantasy drama film directed by . It premiered in the International Critics' Week section at the 2019 Cannes Film Festival, where it won the Nespresso Grand Prize, becoming the first animated film to do so in the section's history. The film was nominated for Best Animated Feature at the 92nd Academy Awards, but lost to Toy Story 4.

Plot
The film begins with a severed hand escaping from a refrigerator in a laboratory and beginning a journey across the suburbs of Paris to reunite with its body, Naoufel. His story is told via flash-backs.

Being very little in Morocco, Naoufel aspires to be a pianist and an astronaut and records his day-to-day life on a tape recorder. During a car journey, he distracts his father while he is driving, causing a crash. He survives, but both of his parents are killed. He is forced to live in France with his emotionally distant uncle and his crude cousin. Now, Naoufel works as a pizza deliveryman, often criticized by his boss for being late. On one occasion, Naoufel delivers a pizza to Gabrielle, at her apartment block. They never see each other, as Naoufel is unable to get through the lobby's malfunctioning security door, but have a conversation through the intercom, and Naoufel becomes infatuated with her and is ready to make everything in order to seduce her.

Naoufel tracks Gabrielle to the library where she works and follows her to a near-by neighborhood where she drops off medicine to a carpenter, her uncle Gigi. Naoufel, seeing an ad for an apprentice in the window, quickly uses this as an excuse for why he is there. Gigi is reluctant but accepts after learning that Naoufel is an orphan. Naoufel moves out of his uncle's house and into an attic apartment provided by Gigi. He learns the tools of the trade and edges closer to Gabrielle, though he never mentions their first encounter.

After a conversation about the arctic, Naoufel builds a wooden igloo on a rooftop of a near-by building for Gabrielle. Returning home one day, he finds his cousin talking to Gabrielle, and finds that he has invited them both to a party. That evening, Naoufel takes Gabrielle to the rooftops, where they discuss fate and Naoufel wonders if it can be changed by doing something unexpected, such as leaping from the roof onto a near-by crane. Naoufel shows Gabrielle the igloo he built and reveals that they had met before when he delivered pizza. Gabrielle is upset, fearing that Naoufel had taken advantage of Gigi solely in order to pursue her. Gabrielle leaves in a rage. Hurt, Naoufel goes to his cousin's party alone and gets into a drunken fight. The next morning, Naoufel goes to work hung-over, sporting a black eye. While cutting wood on a bandsaw, Naoufel is distracted by a fly and tries to catch it, snagging his watch on the blade and severing his hand.

The hand eventually reaches Naoufel and lies on his bed while he sleeps, but it can't re-attach itself and eventually hides under the bed. Naoufel, depressed and hopeless, revisits his old tape recorder, which still has recordings of his parents – including the fatal car ride. Gigi attempts to talk to him, but Naoufel doesn't respond. Gabrielle comes to see him and finds his room empty. Inside the cupboard, she finds an igloo that his severed hand had built out of sugar cubes. After searching the empty igloo on the roof, Gabrielle finds Naoufel's old, abandoned tape recorder and discovers a new recording on it. Listening, she learns he had leapt off the ledge and onto the crane as he had once discussed.

After making the jump, Naoufel lies in the crane and smiles to himself as he looks out at the city. His severed hand retreats into the snow.

Voice cast

Release
In May 2019, following its Cannes premiere, Netflix acquired the worldwide distribution rights to the film, excluding France, Turkey, China and the Benelux region.

The film was released in France on 6 November 2019 by distributor Rezo Films. Netflix also gave the film a theatrical release in some countries, including the United States on 15 November and the United Kingdom on 22 November.

Reception

Box office
I Lost My Body grossed $1,106,777 in France and $29,654 in Turkey, bringing its total box office earnings to $1,136,431.

Critical reception
The site's consensus states, "Beautifully animated and utterly unique, I Lost My Body takes audiences on a singularly strange journey whose unexpected contours lead to a wholly satisfying destination." On Metacritic, the film has a weighted average score of 81 out of 100 based on reviews from 19 critics, indicating "universal acclaim".

Jordan Mintzer of The Hollywood Reporter called the film "A highly original and rather touching account of loss, both physical and emotional."
Peter Debruge of Variety magazine wrote: "I'd hazard to say it's one of the most original and creative animated features I've ever seen: macabre, of course — how could it be otherwise, given the premise? — but remarkably captivating and unexpectedly poetic in the process."

Accolades

References

External links

 
 
 

2010s French animated films
2010s fantasy drama films
2019 animated films
2019 films
2019 fantasy films
2019 drama films
Animated films based on novels
Annecy Cristal for a Feature Film winners
Annie Award winners
Belgian animated films
Films about amputees
Films based on French novels
Films based on speculative fiction novels
French animated feature films
French animated speculative fiction films
French fantasy drama films
French animated fantasy films
French-language Netflix original films
Films produced by Marc du Pontavice
Xilam films
French adult animated films
2010s French-language films